Dildarnagar is a municipality in Kamsaar of Ghazipur District, Uttar Pradesh, India. Dildarnagar is a fast-developing town. It is located 34 km from Ghazipur. It is also known as the heart of the Kamsaar-o-bar region. The total area of Dildarnagar includes Fatehpur Bazar, Dildarnagar Gao, and Nirahukapura. These four neighbourhoods form the town of Dildarnagar. As of the 2011 census, the population of Dildarnagar was 28,913 and the town had an area of 1,995.95 hectares. Dildarnagar is on the road from Varanasi to Buxar. It was also the capital of Dildarnagar Estate.

History

Ancient period
Between the town and the station there is mound called Akhandha, said to have been the seat of Raja Naval. The large tank to the west is called Rani Sagar, after where his famous queen, Damayanti is located. It was reconstructed in 1710 by Raja Deendar Khan.

Medieval period

Dildarnagar was founded on 16 July 1698 by a Kunwar Naval Singh who adopted Islam and kept his name Raja Deendar Khan in 1674. Deendar Khan kept the name as Deendarnagar, but because of wrong pronunciation during the British rule over India, the name of was changed to Dildarnagar in 1839. Kunwar Naval Singh used to live in the village named Samohta located in Chainpur tehsil of Bihar, India. One day the Mughal emperor, Aurangzeb passed to the village and, being influenced by Naval Singh's brother, he adopted the aforementioned brother in 1674. He named his brother Miya Danish Khan. Aurangzeb also made Danish Khan the jagirdar of a place near Delhi in 1680s and gave him the title of Raja. After that, the whole family of Naval Singh shifted to Lahore and adopted Islam in 1660s. Kunwar Naval Singh was named Raja Muhammad Deendar Khan. Deedar Khan was a descendant of the family of Chainpur in Kaimur. Deendar Khan came to Ghazipur district and bought the village named Akhanda with 592 coins used during the Aurangzeb Empire in 1698 and started living there. Dildarnagar also saw the battle of Dildarnagar. Raja Deendar Khan Build was an Eid Gah in the village between 1699 and 1705 CE. During Mughals empire, Usia and Dewaitha were the main market centers of Dildarnagar Kamsar and Zamania. But Dildarnagar was also a large market area during the 1700s. The soldiers during 1700 and 1800s lived at Bahadurpur, Palia, Sihani, Dharni, Seorai, Mahana, Karma, Pokhra, Umarganj, Daudpur, Deorhi, Karmahari, Ramgar (Bihar), Baruin, Khargazipur, Kamsarsaray (Bihar) and Tiyari villages. Later, many families shifted to these villages after the end of Kamsaar Raj.

British period
Dildarnagar's original name was Deendarnagar, derived from its founder, Raja Deendar Khan. Regional pronunciations led in 1838 to a British officer writing the name as Dildarnagar. Dildarnagar was made a town in 1879, after Dildarnagar Junction Railway Station was built by the British Government in 1862. Fatehpur Bazaar was originally a market of Usia village but in the 1890s it was added to Dildarnagar.

Demographics
The town is home to about 28,913, among them 15,034 (52%) are male and 13,879 (48%) are female. 97% of the whole population are from general caste, 3% are from schedule caste and 0% are schedule tribes. The child (under 6 years old) population of Dildarnagar is 12%, among them 53% are boys and 47% are girls. There are 4,200 households in the city and an average of 7 people live in every family. Population of the city has increased by 14.8% in the last years. In the 2001 census, the total population here were about 25 thousand. Female population growth rate of the city is 14.4% which is -0.8% lower than male population growth rate of 15.2%. General caste population has increased by 19%; Schedule caste population has decreased by -43.8% and child population has decreased by -14.8% in the city since the last census. Dildarnagar has 22% (6,426) population engaged in either main or marginal works. 34% of the male and 8% of the female population are working population. 24% of the total male population are main (full time) workers and 10% are marginal (part time) workers. For women, 6% of the total female population are main and 2% are marginal workers.

During Mughal empire the family of Dildarnagar had many soldiers who lived in the fort or in the town of Dildarnagar but some of the soldiers also lived in other villages. After the declining of Mughals the number of soldiers in Dildarnagar also declined. There were also many perchents in the town.

Religion

Hindus contribute 60% of the total population and are the largest religious community in the city followed by Muslims which contribute 38% of the total population and not stated are the third largest religious community here with 1.5% population. Christians here are 0.5%. Female Sex ratio per 1,000 male in Hindus are 896 in Muslims are 940 and in Not stated are 1,250. As per the old Census during 1850–1870, very fewer Hindus lived in Dildarnagar and Kamsar. Other than Hindus there were also a small population of Sikhs who are believed to be settled here during 1700s. Later, in 1870s most of the Sikhs converted to Hindusium or Islam or left the place. Because of this, the Population of Sikh has declined in the region. As per the old census of 1820-1880s, it is observed that Dildarnagar and Kamsar was a Muslims majority place. Mostly Hindus belonging to low casts lived here in very small number. After 1865 a large amount of Hindus Rajputs settled here from nearby villages. Later, during 1870-1920s many other cast of Hindus settled here but still the Population was in the hundreds in Kamsar. After the 1950s, census report it is observed that more than 10,000 Hindus came and settled in the region. Most of them belonged to business families. Where the Population of Hindus increased a lot in Dildarnagar.

Agriculture

Agriculture

Dildarnagar has a humid Subtropical climate with large variations between summer and winter temperatures. The average annual rainfall is 1,155 mm. Fog is common in the winters, while hot dry winds, called loo, blow in the summer. As of the 2011 census report, the geographical area of the town is 4,931.1 acres but the total crop producing area of the town is nearly 4,000 acres. All crops grow in Uttar Pradesh and Eastern Bihar are grown in the town. The soil of the town is rich in minerals and resources. The water level of the town is not more than 30 meters deep and towns have many ponds which cover more than 50 acres of land. The town of Dildarnagar is well connected to roads so it is easy to export crops and bring machinery to the town. Dildar nagar is also denoted as the agricultural hub of Ghazipur District. All the materials and machines like Tractors, Combine Harvesters, Balers etc., that are used in agricultural activities are easily available in the town as farming is done with modern machinery. Zamania Canal passes almost through the middle of the town and contributes in making irrigation easier.

Economy

Businesses like brick-making, fertilizer, pesticide manufacturing, cattle-rearing, poultry farming, and fish farming are done in the town. The town also has personally owned oil mills, flower mills, rice mills, dall mills, and sugar mills. The town has many shops, including one shopping mall and some mega markets. The town also has one railway station, eighteen English medium schools, two government schools, and three Degree Colleges. There are six banks in the town and more than ten ATMs. The town also has madrasas, a mosque, a temple and an eidgah. There were two playgrounds in the Dildarnagar as of 2011. The town of Dildarnagar also has one movie theatre which was established in 1962 by Nazir Hussain when he started Kamsar Films. Petrol pumps are easily available in and in close proximity of the town. Rest facilities are also available here. Dildarnagar is the main center of Dildarnagar Kamsar. The main market of Dildarnagar Kamsar, named Fatehpur Bazaar, is here. As of the census of 2011, Dildarnagar has an area of 883 acres and has a population of 4,293 households. On average, each house in Dildarnagar has an area of 8,960 sqft. The town also has a large fishery that spreads over 66 acres and is one of the main fisheries of the region.

Infrastructure

Education
There are more than fifty educational institutes in Dildarnagar, and many of them have been serving education for more than fifty years. The number of schools in Dildarnagar have increased a lot during 1950-1990s. During older days the number of schools were less because of which the people had to go to the city of Ghazipur for better education. After Dildarnagar Fatehpur Bazar and Dildarnagar Junction railway station was established, a large number of schools were built and the town grew up very quickly. There were also very few English medium schools during 1930s and 1940s. Some of the notable schools, colleges, and institutions in the town include Adarsh Vidyalaya Inter College, Crescent Convent School, New Shah Faiz Public School, St. Fransis Academy, Noble Senior Secondary School, St. Xavier's School, SKBM Degree College, Government Girls Inter College, and Shahzada Industrial Training Institute. Other than these, there are also some Madarsas. These include Jamia Arabia Makhuznul Uloom, Jamia Karima, Madinatul Ilm, and others. Jamia Arabia Makhzunul Uloom is also the largest college of Islamic Studies in Ghazipur District. The town has three Degree Colleges and more than 20 Madarsas. Other than these, there is also a Ashram located near the town which was established in the 1970s. There are also some Government Schools in the town. There is also technical Institute and a Medical college which are under construction.

Transport

Dildarnagar is located almost 34 km from the main city of Ghazipur. Dildarnagar is located on the road from Varansi to Buxar. The Dildarnagar Junction railway station is one of the busiest railway stations in Ghazipur, with almost 10,000 daily passengers. Dildarnagar Junction railway station was built in 1862, connected to the Mughalsarai line. It was connected to Tarighat in 1880. The nearest international airport is Lal Bahadur Shahtri Airport, located in Varanasi. Other than international airports, Azamgarh Airport is the nearest national airport to Dildarnagar.

Health

There are many hospitals and clinics located in Dildarnagar. The condition of Dildarnagar in terms of health is good. Some of the most notable hospitals located in the town of Dildarnagar are Bindeshwari Memorial Hospital, NN Tiwari Hospital, SBM Hospital, Government Hospital, Dr. Dilip Kumar Sharma Hospital, Madeeha Hospital, Life Care Hospital, Shahwat Hospital, Fatima Hospital, Shivam Hospital, and MS Memorial Eye Hospital. Other than these hospitals, there are also many clinics in Dildarnagar.

Neighborhoods
Dildarnagar Gao, Fatehpur Bazar, Dildarnagar Gao Bazaar, Kamsaar Bazaar, Nirahukapura, Tajpur, Hussainabad, Banglapar, TRD Colony, Kot Muhallah, Purabh Muhallah, Paschim Muhallah, Uttar Muhallah, Dakhin Muhallah, and Station road.

See also
Dildarnagar Kamsar

References

Dildarnagar
Populated places established in 1698
Cities and towns in Ghazipur district